Lachaud is a French surname. Notable people with the surname include:

 Bastien Lachaud (born 1980), French politician representing la France Insoumise
 Joseph Lachaud de Loqueyssie (1848–1896), deputy of Tarn-et-Garonne
 Yvan Lachaud (born 1954), member of the National Assembly of France

French-language surnames